Esmilzo Joner "Ish" Polvorosa (born March 22, 1997) is a Filipino volleyball player who plays for the Philippine national team.

Personal life 
Polvorosa was born and raised in Imus, Cavite. He graduated as second honorable mention at Anabu II Elementary School and studied middle school at Unida Christian Colleges. He took up AB European Studies at Ateneo de Manila University where he played in the Ateneo Blue Eagles volleyball team. He joined the Cignal HD Spikers in 2017. In 2018, he was elected as SK Chairman for Barangay Anabu 2-B in Imus, Cavite. Polvorosa is also a member of the LGBTQ community.

Awards

Individuals
 2013 UAAP Season 76 "Best Setter"
 2014 UAAP Season 77 "Best Setter"
 2014 UAAP Season 77 "Finals Most Valuable Player"
 2016 UAAP Season 78  "Best Setter"
 2016 Spikers' Turf Collegiate Conference "Best Setter"
 2017 UAAP Season 79  "Best Setter"
 2017 Premier Volleyball League Collegiate Conference "Best Setter"
 2018 UAAP Season 80  "Best Setter"

Collegiate 
 2013 UAAP Season 76 -  Runners-up, with Ateneo Blue Eagles
 2014 UAAP Season 77 -  Champions, with Ateneo Blue Eagles
 2015 Spikers' Turf Collegiate Conference -  Champions, with Ateneo Blue Eagles 
 2016 UAAP Season 78 -  Champions, with Ateneo Blue Eagles
 2016 Spikers' Turf Collegiate Conference -  Champions, with Ateneo Blue Eagles
 2017 UAAP Season 79 -  Champions, with Ateneo Blue Eagles
 2017 Premier Volleyball League Collegiate Conference -  Champions, with Ateneo Blue Eagles
 2018 UAAP Season 80 -  Runners-up, with Ateneo Blue Eagles

Club team
 2018 Premier Volleyball League Reinforced Conference -   Runners-up, with Cignal HD Spikers
 2018 Spikers' Turf Open Conference -   Bronze medal, with Cignal HD Spikers
 2019 Spikers' Turf Open Conference -   Gold medal, with Cignal HD Spikers

National team
 2019 Thailand Open Sealect Tuna Championships - , Bronze medal
 2019 Southeast Asian Games - , Runners-up

References 

Ateneo de Manila University alumni
Filipino men's volleyball players
University Athletic Association of the Philippines volleyball players
Living people
1997 births
People from Imus
Competitors at the 2019 Southeast Asian Games
Southeast Asian Games medalists in volleyball
Southeast Asian Games silver medalists for the Philippines
Filipino LGBT sportspeople
LGBT volleyball players
Setters (volleyball)